Daria Zabawska (born 16 April 1995 in Białystok) is a Polish athlete specialising in the discus throw. She won a silver medal at the 2017 European U23 Championships.

Her personal best in the event is 60.23 metres set in Tallinn in 2015.

Her parents are former shot putters, Krystyna Danilczyk-Zabawska and Przemysław Zabawski, the latter being also her coach.

International competitions

References

1995 births
Living people
Polish female discus throwers
Sportspeople from Białystok
Podlasie Białystok athletes
Competitors at the 2017 Summer Universiade
Competitors at the 2019 Summer Universiade
Bialystok University of Technology alumni